Ballyallaban ringfort or sometimes An Rath ("The Rath") is an earthen ringfort south of Ballyvaughan in the Burren area, in County Clare, Ireland. It is a National Monument.

Location
The fort lies right next to the R480 road between the village of Ballyvaughan and Leamaneh Castle. It is located in the townland of Ballyallaban, in the civil parish of Rathborney.

Description
The ringfort has an internal diameter of around 100 feet (200 feet including the moat) and is in good condition, although trees grow on much of the structure. The ramparts were built with the earth dug out of the moat, which still fills with water after rain.

The walls were originally even higher, and the moat deeper, than they are now. The embankment was most likely topped by a wooden palisade.

Designation
The national monument including Ballyallaban ringfort, number 648, actually consists of two separate forts: the earthen Ballyallaban ringfort, and the nearby stone fort of Cahermore.

References

External links

 Info at Clare Library
 T.J. Westropp on the forts of Ballyallaban

Archaeological sites in County Clare
Forts in the Republic of Ireland
Former populated places in Ireland
National Monuments in County Clare